This is a List of parks in San Francisco

Federal

National Park Service
Golden Gate National Recreation Area (partially), including
Alcatraz
China Beach
Fort Funston
Fort Mason
Fort Miley (partially)
Lands End
Ocean Beach
The Presidio, including
Baker Beach
Crissy Field
Fort Point
San Francisco National Cemetery
Sutro District, including
Cliff House
Sutro Baths
Sutro Heights Park
San Francisco Maritime National Historical Park, including
Aquatic Park
Hyde Street Pier
United States Fish and Wildlife Service
Farallon National Wildlife Refuge

National Oceanic and Atmospheric Administration
Gulf of the Farallones National Marine Sanctuary (partially)

State
California Department of Parks & Recreation
Angel Island State Park (partially)
Candlestick Point State Recreation Area

California Department of Fish and Game
Farallon Islands State Marine Conservation Area

University of California
Mount Sutro Open Space Reserve

City

San Francisco Recreation & Parks Department

Alamo Square
Alta Plaza
Balboa Park
Bayview Park
Bernal Heights Park
Boeddeker Park
Buena Vista Park
Candlestick Park
Cayuga Park
Corona Heights Park
Crane Cove Park
Dolores Park
Duboce Park
Francisco Park
Garfield Square
Glen Canyon Park
Golden Gate Park, including
AIDS Memorial Grove (affiliated with the National Park Service as a national memorial)
California Academy of Sciences
Conservatory of Flowers
Japanese Tea Garden
Kezar Stadium
M. H. de Young Memorial Museum
Music Concourse
Polo Fields
San Francisco Botanical Garden
Grand View Park
Harding Park Golf Club
Heron's Head Park
Holly Park
Huntington Park
In Chan Kaajal Park
Lincoln Park, including
California Palace of the Legion of Honor
Lafayette Park (San Francisco)
Lake Merced
Larsen Park
McLaren Park (John McLaren Park)
Marina Green
Mount Davidson Park
Mount Olympus
Mountain Lake Park
Palace of Fine Arts
The Panhandle
Park Presidio Boulevard (roadway maintained by Caltrans)
Pine Lake Park, including
Pine Lake
Pink Triangle Park
Pioneer Park, including
Coit Tower
Portsmouth Square
Precita Park
San Francisco Zoo
Sigmund Stern Recreation Grove
South Park
Sue Bierman Park
Twin Peaks
Union Square
Warm Water Cove
Washington Square

Office of Community Investment and Infrastructure (former San Francisco Redevelopment Agency)
Mission Creek Park
Rincon Park
South Beach Park
Yerba Buena Gardens

Private
Oracle Park
Ghirardelli Square
Levi's Plaza

Privately-Owned Public Open Spaces
In certain districts, private developers must account for and maintain public spaces within their facilities. These Privately-Owned Public Open Spaces (POPOS) take many forms and have varying hours of operation.

55 2nd St - A, B, C
101 2nd St
235 2nd St
Marriott - 299 2nd St
Courtyard A
Courtyard B
Courtyard C
Marathon Plaza - 303 2nd St
1 Bush Street
345 California St
A
East B
West C
1 California St
50 California St
100 California St
150 California St
200 California St
555 California St
600 California St
650 California St
Empire Park - 648 Commercial St.
Embarcadero Center West 1, 2, & 3
611 Folsom St
14 Fremont St
Foundry Square - 400, 405, 500 Howard St
Intercontinental Hotel  - 888 Howard St.
Pacific Terrace
Bay Terrace
25 Jessie St
1 Kearny St
333 Market St
425 Market St
444 Market St
525 Market St
555/557 Market St
595 Market St
Westfield Sky Terrace - 845 Market St
Golden Gate University - 536 Mission St
555 Mission St
560 Mission St
456 Montgomery St
100 Pine St
1 Post St
Citigroup Center - 1 Sansome St
343 Sansome St
49 Stevenson St
71 Stevenson St
Crocker Galleria - 165 Sutter St
Trinity Alley - at 333 Bush St
77 Van Ness Ave
Redwood Park - 535 Washington St

See also

10-Minute Walk
Golden Gate National Parks Conservancy
San Francisco Parks Alliance
List of lap pools in San Francisco

References

San Francisco, California parks
 
Parks